In Heaven There Is No Beer? is a (1984) American documentary film by Les Blank about the life, culture and food surrounding devotees of polkas.

Accolades
It won a special jury award at the 1985 Sundance Film Festival, as well as the Grand Prix at the 1985 Melbourne International Film Festival.

Home media
It was released on DVD and Blu-ray via The Criterion Collection as part of the Always for Pleasure set.

See also
Polka music
Frankie Yankovic
Beer

References

External links
Official website
In Heaven There Is No Beer? on IMDb
Excerpt on Les Blank Films' official YouTube channel

American documentary films
1984 films
Documentary films about music and musicians
Polka
Films directed by Les Blank
1980s English-language films
1980s American films